Zhulkarnain bin Abdul Rahim (Jawi: ذو القرنين عبدالرحيم; born 1980) is a Singaporean politician and lawyer. A member of the governing People's Action Party (PAP), he has been the Member of Parliament (MP) representing the Keat Hong division of Chua Chu Kang GRC since 2020.

Early life and education 
Zhulkarnain grew up with five siblings while his father was the sole breadwinner of the family. 

He graduated from National University of Singapore with a Bachelor of Laws degree honours in 2005 and subsequently completed a Master of Laws degree in Islamic law and finance in 2013 at the Singapore Management University.

Career 
Zhulkarnain is a partner at Dentons Rodyk and Davidson. He was named in the Asian Legal Business ALB 40 under 40 2016 List of the brightest young legal minds in the region and a shortlisted finalist in the 2017 Young Lawyer of the Year category of the ALB South East Asia Law Awards. In 2017, he won the JCI Singapore: Ten Outstanding Young Persons of the World Award in the category of Political, Legal and Government Affairs.

Politics 
Zhulkarnain was fielded in the 2020 general election to contest in Chua Chu Kang GRC on the People's Action Party's (PAP) ticket against the Progress Singapore Party. Zhulkarnain's running mates were Gan Kim Yong, Low Yen Ling, Don Wee. On 11 July 2020, Zhulkarnain was declared an elected Member of Parliament representing Chua Chu Kang GRC in the 14th Parliament after the PAP team in Chua Chu Kang GRC garnered 58.64% of the valid votes. He was then appointed Deputy Chairperson of Home Affairs and Law Government Parliamentary Committee (GPC) in Parliament.

References 

People's Action Party politicians
1980 births
Living people
Singapore Management University alumni
21st-century Singaporean lawyers
Members of the Parliament of Singapore